Ron Greenberg (born 1940?) is an American television game show producer who worked on numerous network and syndicated programs of that genre from the 1960s through the 1990s.

His credits include Camouflage, Word for Word, Let's Play Post Office, Reach for the Stars, Dream House, Sale of the Century, The Money Maze, The Joker's Wild, Tic-Tac-Dough, Hollywood Connection, Play the Percentages, and Bullseye. 

He packaged five games: The Who, What or Where Game (1969-1974); The Big Showdown (1974-1975); The Pop 'N Rocker Game (1983-1984); a remake of The Who, What, or Where Game titled The Challengers (1990-1991); and a remake of Let's Make a Deal (1990-1991).

Greenberg created and hosted a weekly quiz radio show on Shokus Internet Radio titled Anyone Can Play ... But Don't Call Us, We'll Call You. However, Greenberg has since relinquished hosting duties to game show veteran Larry Anderson.

References 
 David Schwartz, Steve Ryan and Fred Wostbrock, The Encyclopedia of TV Game Shows, Third edition (New York: Checkmark Books, 1999)

External links 
 
 Shokus Internet Radio site

American television producers
Living people
Place of birth missing (living people)
Year of birth missing (living people)